Chelisoches (name coming from Greek from χηλη οχεω 'pincer-carrier') is a genus of earwigs in the family Chelisochidae. Species are from the Pacific Islands. C. morio has been introduced to California and Florida.

Species
This genus includes the following species:

 Chelisoches annulatus
 Chelisoches ater (Bormans, 1900)
 Chelisoches australicus (Le Guillou, 1841)
 Chelisoches handschini Günther, 1934
 Chelisoches kimberleyensis Mjöberg, 1913
 Chelisoches morio (Fabricius, 1775)

Names brought to synonymy
 Chelisoches elegans De Bormans, 1900, a synonym for Euenkrates elegans (De Bormans, 1900) [Srivastava 1976].

References

External links

 
 Chelisoches at Bug Guide
 Chelisoches at dermaptera.speciesfile.org

Chelisochidae
Dermaptera genera
Taxa named by Samuel Hubbard Scudder